Taylor Townsend (born April 16, 1996) is an American professional tennis player. She reached career-high WTA rankings of world No. 61 in singles (July 2018) and No. 20 in doubles (February 2023). She also reached the doubles final of the 2022 US Open with Caty McNally.

She was named the ITF Junior World Champion in 2012 for finishing the year No. 1 in the girls' rankings, making her the first American to do so since 1982. In that year, she won the junior Australian Open titles in both singles and doubles, and three out of the four junior Grand Slam doubles titles in total.

Personal life and background
Taylor was born in Chicago to Gary and Sheila (Jones) Townsend. Her parents are both high school administrators, and her mother used to work as a banker. Sheila played Division II tennis at Lincoln University in Missouri. Taylor has an older sister, Symone, who played college tennis at Florida A&M.

Townsend started playing tennis at the age of six, and was one of the first junior players to participate in the XS Tennis program run by [Kamau Murray]. Murray is better known for coaching Sloane Stephens to a grand slam title. When she was eight years old, she moved to Atlanta to continue training with Donald Young's father. Townsend's mother is a close friend of Donald Young sr., as the two of them grew up together on the South Side of Chicago, where they trained at the same tennis center.

At age 14, Townsend moved to Boca Raton, Florida, to join the USTA development program. When the USTA decided not to fund Townsend's expenses to compete at the 2012 US Open, Murray and XS Tennis organized a fundraiser to cover nearly $1000 of the cost of the trip. After that, Townsend split time training with Murray in Chicago and Zina Garrison in the Washington, D.C. area. Since 2015, Donald Young sr. has again served as her coach. Townsend tries to model her game after her tennis idol, Martina Navratilova.

On October 14, 2020, Townsend announced via social media that she was pregnant. She gave birth to her son Adyn Aubrey on March 14, 2021.

Junior career

Townsend won the 2012 Australian Open junior tournament at the age of 15 to become only the second American to ever win that title after Kim Kessaris in 1989. She also won the doubles title at the same event to become first American to win both the singles and doubles titles at a junior Grand Slam event since Lindsay Davenport accomplished the feat at the 1992 US Open. A few months later, Townsend won the Easter Bowl to help complete her rise to No. 1 in the ITF junior rankings before the end of April.

Townsend continued her major success in doubles that year by winning the Junior Wimbledon title with Eugenie Bouchard and the US Open title with Gabrielle Andrews, with whom she also partnered at the Australian Open. The only Grand Slam that eluded Townsend was the French Open, where she lost in the semifinals while partnering with Bouchard. Additionally, she was able to win the US Open title in spite of being asked to sit out that tournament by the USTA over fitness concerns. This was only the seventh year where a player or team was able to win three out of four Grand Slam doubles titles, with senior Grand Slam winners Victoria Azarenka and Sloane Stephens among the others to complete this task. Townsend finished the season as the No. 1 ranked junior in the world, for which she was named the 2012 ITF Junior World Champion. She became the first American girl to hold this honor since Gretchen Rush in 1982.

She continued to play on the junior tour in 2013 and reached another Grand Slam championship singles final at Wimbledon, this time losing to Belinda Bencic. She also competed in the USTA Junior National Championship as the No. 4 seed and was knocked out in the semifinals by No. 2, Allie Kiick.

Professional career

Early years: WTA doubles final
Townsend entered her first professional-level tournament in October 2010 at the age of 14 and was able to win her first career match. She also played in the doubles event at the 2011 US Open when she was 15 years old and reached the third round with her compatriot Jessica Pegula. She also received a wildcard into the singles qualifying draw and defeated world No. 122, Arantxa Parra Santonja, in the first round. The following year, Townsend requested another wildcard into the US Open and was declined because of the USTA's concerns about her fitness. The USTA received widespread criticism for this decision.

Townsend made her WTA Tour debut in singles at the 2013 Indian Wells Open; she defeated Lucie Hradecká for her first tour-level match win. Her next WTA Tour main-draw appearance came at the Washington Open. After Townsend lost in singles, she competed in the doubles event with Genie Bouchard, her doubles partner from their Wimbledon girls' doubles title the previous summer. The duo made it all the way to the final, the first career WTA Tour final for either player.

2014: First Grand Slam match wins

In back-to-back weeks in the spring, Townsend played at two clay-court events on the USTA pro circuit at Charlottesville and Indian Harbour Beach. She won both the singles and doubles titles at each of these events, her first such ITF titles. Townsend partnered with Asia Muhammad in doubles at both tournaments. With this success, she won the USTA wildcard entry into the French Open, where Townsend made her Grand Slam singles debut ranked No. 205. She defeated fellow American No. 65, Vania King, and upset the top-ranked French woman, world No. 21 Alizé Cornet, to advance to the third round, in which she lost to No. 15, Carla Suárez Navarro. Sloane Stephens was the only other American woman to make it that far in the tournament.

Townsend also received wildcards to make her main-draw debuts at the last two major events of the year, Wimbledon and the US Open, but lost in the first round at each tournament. The latter loss was to Serena Williams, who went on to win the title.

2015: Top 100 debut, and decline

Townsend broke into the top 100 at the very start of the season, after reaching the second round at the Auckland Open. With a higher ranking, she gained direct entry into the Australian Open and lost to Caroline Wozniacki in the first round. In February, she made her Fed Cup debut against Argentina and won her only match, a dead rubber where she was partnered with CoCo Vandeweghe. Townsend then fell out of the top 100 in April and began to struggle with her form, winning just two matches on the ITF Circuit the rest of the year and none at the WTA Tour level. She finished the year ranked outside of the top 300.

2016: Resurgence, ITF doubles dominance
With a lower ranking, Townsend returned to playing ITF events almost exclusively. Her decision to switch back to her childhood coach, Donald Young sr. after the 2015 French Open eventually began to pay off as she regained her form in the spring. In April, she repeated her feat from 2014 of winning both the singles and doubles titles at Charlottesville. This again helped her win the French Open Wild Card Challenge. After partnering with Asia Muhammad just once in 2015, the previously successful doubles team recombined to win five ITF doubles titles by the end of April, including back-to-back-to-back clay court titles at Pelham, Dothan, and Charlottesville. Townsend returned to the top 200 by May and got back to No. 154, after winning her first-round match at the French Open. From there, her ranking steadily rose to as high as No. 131 in the world near the end of the year. She also finished the season with eight ITF doubles titles to reach a year-end doubles ranking of No. 73.

2017: Return to top 100

Up until the very end of the year, Townsend maintained her ranking just outside of the top 100. She reached the third round of the Miami Open as a qualifier, her best result at a Premier tier tournament to date. In the spring, Townsend had a quieter clay-court season compared to the previous year, but still won a match at the French Open yet again. She produced another solid performance at a premier tournament in August, making it to the second round at the Cincinnati Open after needing to qualify for the main draw. Towards the end of the season, she won both the singles and doubles events at back-to-back tournaments for the second time in her career, this time at the $25k level. In her final tournament of the year, Townsend played in the Waco Showdown and dominated the early rounds, losing a total of just two games in her first three matches. Townsend ended up winning this $80K event for the biggest title of her career. With this result, she also returned to the top 100.

2018: Career-high ranking
In the spring, Townsend delivered an exemplary performance during the American ITF clay-court season. She reached the semifinals at two out of the four events (Indian Harbour Beach and Charlottesville) and won the title at the other two tournaments (Dothan and Charleston), both of which were $80k events. She also easily won the French Open Wildcard Challenge for the third time in her career. At the end of this stretch of events, Townsend reached a career-high ranking of No. 73 in the world.

She played for the Philadelphia Freedoms in the World TeamTennis league, where she was awarded the season's Female MVP. The team lost in the WTT Finals.

2019–20: US Open fourth round, best career year-end
At the 2019 US Open, Townsend achieved her first victory against a top-10 player, upsetting world No. 4, Simona Halep, in a third-set tiebreaker in the second round. She went one step further, defeating another Romanian Sorana Cîrstea to reach the fourth round for the first time in her career at a major and as a qualifier.

At the 2020 US Open, she reached the semifinals in doubles for the first time in her career at a Grand Slam championship, partnering with Asia Muhammad.

2022: US Open final & French Open semifinal in doubles
At the French Open, Townsend reached the semifinals for the first time in her career at this major with Madison Keys as a protected ranking pair on their debut. She also used her protected ranking to participate in the main draw in singles after coming back from maternity leave.

At the US Open, she ended runners-up in the doubles final with Caty McNally.

2023: Second and third WTA doubles titles
Townsend started 2023 with her second and third doubles titles on the WTA Tour by winning both editions of the Adelaide International, partnering Asia Muhammad in 1 and Luisa Stefani in 2.

World TeamTennis
Townsend has played six seasons with World TeamTennis, making her debut in 2013 with the Sacramento Capitals. She has since played for the Philadelphia Freedoms from 2014 to 2019, even earning the 2018 WTT Female MVP honor by having the top winning percentage in Women's Singles and Women's Doubles for the season.  It was announced she will be joining the Philadelphia Freedoms during the 2020 WTT season set to begin July 12.

Townsend paired up with Fabrice Martin in mixed doubles and Caroline Dolehide and Sofia Kenin in women's doubles throughout the 2020 season. The Freedoms earned a No. 1 seed headed into WTT Playoffs, but ultimately fell to the New York Empire, who would continue on to win the Championship, in the semifinal.

2012 US Open controversy
Townsend was asked by the USTA to sit out of the 2012 US Open Junior tournament because of her weight and also denied her request for a wildcard for the US Open main-draw or the qualifying tournament, which she had received the year before. Patrick McEnroe stated, "Our concern is her long-term health, number one, and her long-term development as a player. We have one goal in mind: For her to be playing in Arthur Ashe Stadium in the main draw and competing for major titles when it's time." Townsend was shocked by the USTA's decision given that she was the top-ranked junior girl in the world.

The decision was sharply criticized by players like Lindsay Davenport and Martina Navratilova. Sports Illustrated wrote, "Instead of helping a promising young talent gain that confidence and experience gleaned from competing, the USTA has taken a paternalistic tack, deeming itself the arbiter and architect behind Townsend's past, present and future success. It's the arrogance of institution built on the belief that there is a tried-and-true formula to build a champion."

The USTA at first refused to pay for Townsend's expenses, so she paid to enter the tournament and was defeated in the quarterfinals by Anett Kontaveit, in straight sets. Later, the USTA agreed to pay for Townsend's expenses as Patrick McEnroe spoke of a miscommunication. Still, the USTA decision cost Townsend an opportunity to compete for a wildcard to enter the main draw of the US Open.

Following the controversy, Townsend split from her USTA coaches and began training with former world No. 4, Olympic doubles gold medalist, and 1990 Wimbledon finalist Zina Garrison, who continued to coach her until 2015.

Performance timelines

Only main-draw results in WTA Tour, Grand Slam tournaments, Fed Cup/Billie Jean King Cup and Olympic Games are included in win–loss records.

Singles
Current through the 2023 Indian Wells qualifying.

Doubles
Current through the 2023 Australian Open.

Mixed doubles

Significant finals

Grand Slam tournaments

Doubles: 1 (1 runner-up)

WTA career finals

Doubles: 6 (3 titles, 3 runner-ups)

WTA Challenger finals

Doubles: 4 (2 titles, 2 runner-ups)

ITF Circuit finals

Singles: 15 (12 titles, 3 runner–ups)

Doubles: 24 (17 titles, 7 runner–ups)

Junior Grand Slam tournament finals

Girls' singles: 2 (1 title, 1 runner-up)

Girls' doubles: 4 (3 titles, 1 runner-up)

Wins over top 10 players

Record against top 10 players
Townsend's match record against players who have been ranked in the top 10.

  Julia Görges 2–0
  Danielle Collins 2–1
  Jessica Pegula 2–1
  Coco Gauff 1–0
  Anett Kontaveit 1–0
  CoCo Vandeweghe 1–0
  Roberta Vinci 1–0
  Andrea Petkovic 1–1
  Sofia Kenin 1–2
  Simona Halep 1–3
  Bianca Andreescu 0–1
  Belinda Bencic 0–1
  Kiki Bertens 0–1
  Ana Ivanovic 0–1
  Ons Jabeur 0–1
  Barbora Krejčíková 0–1
  Svetlana Kuznetsova 0–1
  Kristina Mladenovic 0–1
  Garbiñe Muguruza 0–1
  Jeļena Ostapenko 0–1
  Agnieszka Radwańska 0–1
  Samantha Stosur 0–1
  Carla Suárez Navarro 0–1
  Elina Svitolina 0–1
  Serena Williams 0–1
  Caroline Garcia 0–2
  Daria Kasatkina 0–2
  Flavia Pennetta 0–2
  Sloane Stephens 0–2
  Caroline Wozniacki 0–3

*

References

External links

 
 
 
CoreTennis profile

1996 births
Living people
African-American female tennis players
American female tennis players
Australian Open (tennis) junior champions
US Open (tennis) junior champions
Wimbledon junior champions
Grand Slam (tennis) champions in girls' singles
Grand Slam (tennis) champions in girls' doubles
Tennis people from Illinois
21st-century African-American sportspeople
21st-century African-American women